Abdoulaye Elhadji Ciss (born 26 June 1994) is a Senegalese professional footballer who plays for Swiss club FC Sion, as a defender.

References

1994 births
Living people
Senegalese footballers
FC Sion players
FC Le Mont players
Vaasan Palloseura players
Swiss Challenge League players
Veikkausliiga players
Association football defenders
Senegalese expatriate footballers
Senegalese expatriate sportspeople in Switzerland
Expatriate footballers in Switzerland
Senegalese expatriate sportspeople in Finland
Expatriate footballers in Finland